TV4 Norge was a Norwegian television channel owned by TV4 AB. TV4 Norge started in 1990 and was shut down in 1992 because it didn't make enough money. It was broadcast from the Intelsat VA F-12 satellite on 1 degree west.{dead link}

References

External links
TV Ark

Defunct television channels in Norway
Television channels and stations established in 1990
Television channels and stations disestablished in 1992
1990 establishments in Norway
1992 disestablishments in Norway